Libouchec is a municipality and village in Ústí nad Labem District in the Ústí nad Labem Region of the Czech Republic. It has about 1,900 inhabitants.

Administrative parts
Villages of Čermná, Knínice, and Žďárek are administrative parts of Libouchec.

Geography

From the geomorphological point of view, the municipal territory is very diverse and lies in fourth regions. The built-up area is situated in the valley of the Jílovský brook, which is part of the Most Basin lowland. The valley separates the Central Bohemian Uplands and the eastern tip of the Ore Mountains.

History
The first settlers of the area were Celts and Germanics, from the 5th century initially mainly Slavs and from the late Middle Ages onwards mainly Germans. The first written mention of Libouchec is from 1169 under its German name Königswald. Libouchec gained its Czech name after the eponymous stream.

An important salt trail was running through Libouchec. Salt was carried from here to Děčín where it was embarked and sent to inland. There started an important production in manufacture in the end of feudalism (buttons, textile, primitive machines). In the 16th century, the nobility from Bynov began with logging and mining of ore and silver. In the 19th century its surroundings were an industrial region. There began the production of velvet, liqueurs, mustard and agricultural machines.

Important was the railway which led from Duchcov to Děčín. It was built in 1869 and was the most expensive railway in the country being built at that time. The operation of this railroad was abolished in 2008.

Sights

The most significant buildings are the Church of Three Wise Men and the castle. The church was built in 1357; after burning out it was repaired in the 16th century and from that time it has been rebuilt many times.

The Libouchec Castle, originally named Schönstein, was established by Günter of Bünau in the 16th century. Due to the Thirty Years' War and fires, the castle gradually fell into disrepair and it has been in the emergency conditions. In 2003, the castle was sold and has since been repaired.

References

External links

Villages in Ústí nad Labem District